This article lists the squads for the 2022 Copa América Femenina, the 9th edition of the Copa América Femenina. The tournament is a quadrennial women's international football tournament for national teams in South America organised by CONMEBOL, and was held in Colombia from 8 to 30 July 2022. In the tournament there were ten national teams involved. Each national team registered a squad of 23 players.

The age listed for each player is on 8 July 2022, the first day of the tournament. The numbers of caps and goals listed for each player do not include any matches played after the start of tournament. The club listed is the club for which the player last played a competitive match prior to the tournament. The nationality for each club reflects the national association (not the league) to which the club is affiliated. A flag is included for coaches that are of a different nationality than their own national team.

Group A

Bolivia
The squad was announced on 5 July 2022.

Head coach:  Rosana Gómez

Chile

The squad was announced on 29 June 2022.

Head coach: José Letelier

Colombia
The squad was announced on 3 July 2022.

Head coach: Nelson Abadía

Ecuador
The squad was announced on 30 June 2022.

Head coach:  Emily Lima

Paraguay
The squad was announced on 21 June 2022.

Head coach:  Marcello Frigério

Group B

Argentina
The squad was announced on 27 June 2022. On 6 July, Marianela Szymanowski withdrew due to injury and was replaced by Érica Lonigro.

Head coach: Germán Portanova

Brazil
Top Brazilian goalscorer Marta was unable to play in the tournament due to recovering from a knee ligament injury. The final squad was announced prior to the tournament. Gabi Nunes and Letícia Izidoro withdrew due to injuries and were replaced by Duda Sampaio and Natascha.

Head coach:  Pia Sundhage

Peru
The squad was announced prior to the tournament.

Head coach:

Uruguay
The squad was announced on 26 June 2022. On 2 July 2022, Antonella Ferradans withdrew due to injury and was replaced by Pilar González.

Head coach: Ariel Longo

Venezuela
The squad was announced on 6 July 2022.

Head coach:  Pamela Conti

Player representation

By club
Clubs with 5 or more players represented are listed.

By club nationality

By club federation

By representatives of domestic league

References

Squads
2022